Harry Adamson (15 September 1912 – 1989) was an English professional footballer who played at centre forward.

Adamson was playing for Upton Colliery when he signed for Football League club Bradford City in October 1933. He played just 29 league games for the club in three years but scored 19 goals, including ten from only 12 games in 1934–35 to be the club's leading goal-scorer. He left for Aldershot in May 1937.

References

1912 births
Year of death missing
Sportspeople from Scunthorpe
English footballers
Association football forwards
Upton Colliery F.C. players
Bradford City A.F.C. players
Aldershot F.C. players
English Football League players
1989 deaths